Crocutasis is a genus of flies in the family Stratiomyidae.

Species
Crocutasis abyssinica Lindner, 1935

References

Stratiomyidae
Brachycera genera
Monotypic Brachycera genera
Taxa named by Erwin Lindner
Diptera of Africa